Hetq (meaning The Trace) is an online newspaper published in Yerevan by the Investigative Journalists NGO. It first appeared in 2001 in the Armenian language, and since 2002 it has been publishing in English as well.

The Investigative Journalists of Armenia NGO is a non-government organization founded on 29 July 2000, with the primary goal of assisting the development of investigative journalism in Armenia and to strengthen and develop freedom of speech and democratic principles.

History
Since 2001 the organization has produced investigative films and articles on environmental, social, educational, cultural, judicial, energy, the banking system, and other issues within the scope of different projects. These investigations have revealed various abuses by state and local government as well as the violation of human rights.

Since 2001, the organization has published the Hetq Online internet newspaper (www.hetq.am): The English version of Hetq Online has been published since September 2002, thus garnering authority and credibility amongst foreign readers for the organization.

The investigative articles of Hetq Online are republished by leading Armenian daily newspapers. Hetq Online is the first publication in Armenia to adopt a Code of ethics and every journalist working with the online newspaper is obliged to follow the principles of the code.

Membership
Investigative journalism NGO is a member of the following organizations:
Since 2003: Global Investigative Journalism Network
Since 2005: Association of European Journalists
Since 2007: Organized Crime and Corruption Reporting Project (OCCRP)

See also

 Media in Armenia

References

External links
 
Investigation Articles On Hetq

News agencies based in Armenia
Armenian news websites
Investigative journalism
Newspapers published in Armenia